The Embassy of the Republic of Indonesia in Brussels is the diplomatic mission of the Republic of Indonesia to the Kingdom of Belgium and is concurrently accredited to the Grand Duchy of Luxembourg. In addition, the ambassador serves as the Indonesian representative for the European Union.

See also 

 Belgium–Indonesia relations
 List of diplomatic missions of Indonesia

References 

Brussels
Indonesia